Nikolaos Agapitos "Nikos" Rogkavopoulos (alternate spelling: Rogavopoulos; ; born June 27, 2001) is a Greek professional basketball player for Merkezefendi Bld. Denizli Basket of the Turkish Basketball Super League (BSL). He is a 2.03 m (6 ft 8 in) tall swingman.

Youth career
Rogkavopoulos played from a young age with the youth teams of Doukas, before he started his pro career. In 2016, the Spanish club Real Madrid offered Rogkavopoulos an amateur contract, but he decided to stay in Greece, rather than move to Spain. He played at the Jordan Brand Classic's International Game in 2017.

Professional career
Rogkavopoulos made his professional debut with the Greek 2nd Division club Doukas, in a game against Ethnikos Piraeus, in the Greek Cup in 2016. On July 13, 2017, Rogkavopoulos moved to AEK Athens, after he signed a six-year contract with the club, through the 2022–23 season. He spent the 2017–18 season playing with AEK's junior teams, and on the senior team's practice squad.

For the following season, Rogkavopoulos moved up to AEK's senior team, and he made his debut in Greece's top-tier level Greek Basket League (GBL), during the GBL 2018–19 season. He also made his debut in one of the two European-wide secondary level competitions, FIBA's Basketball Champions League (BCL), in the BCL 2018–19 season. With AEK, he won the 2019 edition of the FIBA Intercontinental Cup, and the Greek Cup title, in 2020.

During the 2020–2021 season, Rogkavopoulos had a falling-out with the club due to playing time concerns as well as withheld contract payments, which ended in his suspension from the team for the rest of the season. In the 2021 offseason, all players under contract with AEK were released in order to be renegotiated under new terms, resulting in Rogkavopoulos's free agency.

In April 2020, Rogkavopoulos declared for the 2020 NBA Draft.

On July 28, 2021, Rogkavopoulos signed a three-year deal with Promitheas Patras of the Greek Basket League and the EuroCup. In 16 league games, he averaged 6.5 points, 4.3 rebounds and 1.1 assists, playing around 20 minutes per contest. He was quietly suspended for disciplinary reasons in the latter stretch of the season.

National team career
Rogkavopoulos has been a member of the junior national teams of Greece. With Greece's junior national teams, he played at the 2017 FIBA Europe Under-16 Championship Division B, where he won a gold medal, and was named the MVP of the tournament. During the tournament, he averaged 18.0 points, 6.9 rebounds, 2.4 assists, 1.4 steals, and 0.5 blocks per game.

He also played at the 2018 FIBA Europe Under-18 Championship, where he averaged 19.7 points, 6.6 rebounds, 2.1 assists, 1.4 steals, and 0.1 blocks per game, and at the 2019 FIBA Under-19 World Cup, where he averaged 13.7 points, 4.6 rebounds, 2.4 assists, 0.7 steals, and 0.7 blocks per game. At the 2019 FIBA Europe Under-18 Championship, he made the All-Tournament Team, after averaging 11.7 points, 8.4 rebounds, 2.0 assists, 1.1 steals, and 0.6 blocks per game, during the tournament.

In June 2021, Rogkavopoulos was picked by the senior national team boss Rick Pitino in the final 12-man squad for the Olympic Qualifying Tournament taking place in Victoria, Canada against China, the Czech Republic, Turkey, Uruguay, and the hosting Canada.

Career statistics

Domestic Leagues

|-
| 2018–19
| style="text-align:left;"| AEK Athens
| align=center | GBL
| 20  || 4.4 || .440 || .250 || .333 || .7 || .2 || .1 || .1 || 1.4
|-
| 2019–20
| style="text-align:left;"| AEK Athens
| align=center | GBL
| 9 || 6.3 || .500 || .250 || 1.000 || 1.7 || .9 || .3 || .1 || 2.1
|}

FIBA Champions League

|-
| style="text-align:left;" | 2018–19
| style="text-align:left;" | A.E.K.
| 2 || .8 || - || - || - || - || - || - || - || -
|}

Honors and awards

Youth club level
Jordan Brand Classic International Game: (2017)

Pro career
FIBA Intercontinental Cup Champion: (2019)
Greek Cup Winner: (2020)

Greek junior national team
2017 FIBA Europe Under-16 Championship Division B: 
2017 FIBA Europe Under-16 Championship Division B: All-Tournament Team & MVP
2019 FIBA Europe Under-18 Championship: All-Tournament Team

References

External links
FIBA Profile (archive)
Eurobasket.com Profile
NBAdraft.net Profile
Draftexpress.com Profile
Realgm.com Profile
Greek Basket League Profile 
Greek Basket League Profile 
Hellenic Basketball Federation Profile 
TBLStat.net Profile

2001 births
Living people
AEK B.C. players
Basketball players from Athens
Doukas B.C. players
Greek Basket League players
Greek men's basketball players
Merkezefendi Belediyesi Denizli Basket players
Promitheas Patras B.C. players
Shooting guards
Small forwards